The 2011 NRW Trophy was an international figure skating competition during the 2011–2012 season. An annual event organized by the Skating Union of North Rhine-Westphalia (NRW), it has been sanctioned by the Deutsche Eislauf Union and the International Skating Union since 2007. 

Figure skaters compete in the disciplines of men's singles, ladies singles, pair skating, and ice dancing. The competition was held in Dortmund, Germany in two parts. The Ice Dance Trophy, in which ice dancers competed at the senior, junior, and novice levels, was held from 4–6 November 2011. The singles and pairs portion, also with senior, junior, and novice levels, was held from 29 November to 4 December 2011.

The NRW Trophy was designated as one of the events at which ice dancers could try to achieve a minimum score.

Entries
The entries are as follows.

Senior results

Men

Ladies

Pairs

Ice dancing

Junior results

Men

Ladies

Pairs 
Five total competitors.

Ice dancing (Junior)

Ice dancing (Basic junior) 
 Compulsory dance: Cha Cha Congelado

Novice results

Boys (Advanced novice)

Boys (Basic novice A) 
No short program. Only two competitors.

Girls (Advanced novice) 
39 total competitors.

Girls (Basic novice A) 
No short program.

Ice dancing (Advanced novice) 
 P1 = Pattern dance: European Waltz 
 P2 = Pattern dance: Tango

Ice dancing (Basic novice B) 
 P1 = Pattern dance: Fourteenstep
 P2 = Pattern dance: European Waltz

Ice dancing (Basic novice A) 
 P1 = Pattern dance: Fourteenstep
 P2 = Pattern dance: European Waltz

References

External links 
 Singles and Pairs Official site: Singles/Pairs detailed results 
 Ice dance official site: Ice dance detailed results
 

NRW Trophy
2011 in figure skating
NRW Trophy